Qaleh-ye Farajollah Beyg (also Romanized as Qal‘eh-ye Farajollāh Beyk; also known as Farajollāh Beyk) is a village in Zalu Ab Rural District, in the Central District of Ravansar County, Kermanshah Province, Iran. At the 2006 census, its population was 31, in 5 families.

References 

Populated places in Ravansar County